Lake Akna is a crater lake located in the Gegham mountains of eastern Kotayk Province of Armenia.

References

See also 
Lake Sevan
Geghama mountains

Akna
Geography of Kotayk Province